The Men's FITA round open was one of the events held in archery at the 1960 Summer Paralympics in Rome.

There were only three competitors - two British and one American. The American archer, Jack Whitman, won gold with a clear lead, scoring 829 points.

References 

M